This is a list of the largest cities in the Organisation of Islamic Cooperation member states, based on the United Nations World Urbanization Prospects report (2010 population estimates from the report's 2007 revision).

See also

 Organisation of Islamic Cooperation
 Islamic World
 Metropolitan areas
 List of cities in the European Union by population within city limits

References and notes

Organisation of Islamic Cooperation
Organisation of Islamic Cooperation-related lists